The BAFTA Fellowship, or the Academy Fellowship, is a lifetime achievement award presented by the British Academy of Film and Television Arts (BAFTA) in recognition of "outstanding achievement in the art forms of the moving image". The award is the highest honour the Academy can bestow, and has been awarded annually since 1971. Fellowship recipients have mainly been film directors, but some have been awarded to actors, film/television producers, cinematographers, film editors, screenwriters and (since 2007)  contributors to the video game industry. In 2002, Merchant Ivory Productions became the first organisation to win the award. People from the United Kingdom dominate the list, but it includes over a dozen U.S. citizens and several from other countries in Europe, though none of the latter have been recognized since 1996. In 2010, Shigeru Miyamoto became the first citizen of an Asian country to receive the award, with video game designer Hideo Kojima becoming the second in 2020.

The inaugural recipient of the award was the filmmaker and producer Alfred Hitchcock. The award has been made posthumously to the comedy pair Morecambe and Wise, in 1999, and to Stanley Kubrick, who died that year and was made a fellow in 2000.

Overall, 88 men have won the award, and 17 women.

Recipients

References

External links
 BAFTA official site
 Fellows of BAFTA
 Full List of BAFTA Fellows

British Academy Film Awards
 
Lifetime achievement awards
Awards established in 1971
1971 establishments in the United Kingdom